Parampara Series – Andhri or Andhri is a national festival of music and dance held in Hyderabad, India. It is organised by renowned Kuchipudi dancers Raja Reddy and Radha Reddy. It is a 3-day, annual event is held at Ravindra Bharathi auditorium. There is another Parampara festival held in New Delhi which started in 1976.

History
Bharata Muni described the characteristics of a madhyama graama janya jati or Raaga called Andhri. The dance style of this region was also mentioned by Bharatamuni in Natya Sastra. The raasa nrityam of the Andhra's was perhaps danced to the music set in the Andhra Jati (present day Kalyani), and Andhri Raaga became the ancient Andhra contribution to the Indian classical music, hence the organisers have given the title ‘ANDHRI’ to our Music and Dance Festival, and started it in 2007.

The Festival
The 3-day festival has renowned artists from Hindustani and Carnatic genres performing at the festival.

Performing artists

2009 festival
 Hindustani Flute renditions by Pandit Hariprasad Chaurasia
 Kathak performance by Dancing Duo Nirupama & Rajendra
 Carnatic Vocal by Madurai TN Seshagopalan
 Hindustani Vocal renditions by Ashwini Bhide
 Mohiniattam Dance performance by Dr. Neena Prasad
 Kuchipudi dance by Raja Reddy and Radha Reddy and their disciples Yamini Reddy with others.

2008 festival
 Hindustani vocal by Parveen Sultana
 Sarod by Amjad Ali Khan
 Bharatanatyam by Geeta Chandran
 Kathak by Jayant Kastuar
 Carnatic Violin by Ganesh and Kumaresh

2007 festival
 Kuchipudi by Raja Reddy & Radha Reddy
 Live Concert Vocal by HariHaran
 Odissi by Sharon Lowen
 Kuchipudi by Shovana Narayan, Aishwarya and Shalu Jindal
 Tabla player - Bickram Ghosh

See also

List of Indian classical music festivals

References

Music festivals in India
Classical music festivals in India
Carnatic classical music festivals
Festivals in Hyderabad, India
Music festivals established in 1997